Themistoklis "Demis" Nikolaidis (born 17 September 1973) is a Greek former professional footballer who played as a striker. He was the forty second president of AEK Athens, and is considered one of the greatest forwards Greece has produced. In his early childhood and teenage years he lived in the city of Alexandroupoli, in the northeast part of Greece. In a sterling career with Ethnikos Alexandroupolis, Apollon Smyrnis, AEK Athens and Atlético Madrid, Nikolaidis earned his reputation as a "born goalscorer", scoring prolifically for club and country. His power, pace and skill on the ball have been widely praised.

Club career

Early years
In his teenage years he played for Ethnikos Alexandroupolis, the local team of his hometown. The scouts of several teams had seen his progress from these years, earning him a move to Athens. He made his professional debut at the age of 20 at Apollon Athens. With Apollon, he reached the Greek Cup final on 15 May 1996, where they got lost to a record defeat of 7–1 from AEK Athens. His performances sparked a bidding war between Panathinaikos and Olympiacos, as well as the striker's childhood favorite club, AEK Athens. Demis refused to join Olympiacos and forced his club president to sell him to AEK for 288 milion drachmas and Pantelis Konstantinidis as an exchange.

AEK Athens
At AEK, Nikolaidis linked up with some of the great Greek international players of his generation, including Vasilios Tsiartas, Theodoros Zagorakis, Michalis Kapsis, Grigoris Georgatos, Traianos Dellas, Vasilios Lakis. With his new side, Nikolaidis excelled, scoring on his debut against Ionikos. During his time with AEK, Demis managed to win three Greek Cups and the 1996 Greek Super Cup, while he was the top scorer in the 1999 Greek league and second scorer in the 2001 UEFA Cup (1 goal behind topscorer Dimitar Berbatov). He is the top scorer of Greek clubs in European competitions having scored 26 goals in 51 games. He has scored five goals in a match twice and is the only Greek player to have scored 4 goals in a European match.

Having scored a total of 21 goals in the UEFA Cup he is one of the competition's all-time topscorers. At AEK he scored 190 goals in 266 games (including European, cup and domestic league games) making him the fourth highest goalscorer for the club. On 24 March 2002, the International Committee for Fair Play awarded him with the Fair Play Award, an honorary diploma for his conduct in the Greek Cup Final on 8 May 2000, between the teams of AEK Athens and Ionikos, when Nikolaidis informed the referee he had used his hand to score a goal that had been allowed as valid.

Atlético Madrid
After quarrelling with owner Makis Psomiadis, later indicted for forgery, and allegedly being assaulted by his bodyguards, Nikolaidis decided the time had come to leave AEK after the 2002–03 season. He asked and left the team in a mutual consent free transfer, although he was already paid for the rest of his contract. Atlético Madrid beat several other clubs to land the striker's coveted signature. Seeing that his number 11 was taken, he wore the number 21 as a tribute to AEK and the Original 21 fan club. Nikolaidis' first months at the Vicente Calderón Stadium were a tremendous success, he scored six goals and formed a fearsome attacking pair with teenage sensation Fernando Torres. However, a series of serious injuries kept him out of the first team for nearly the rest of the season and severely affecting his chances of getting picked for Euro 2004. Although Atletico wanted to keep him to the roster of the team, Nikolaidis decided to retire from professional football.

International career
Demis made his debut for the Greece national football team on 26 April 1995 against Russia. In 1999, however, along with Michalis Kasapis and Ilias Atmatsidis, Nikolaidis retired from the national team, protesting for injustice in the Greek football. Two years later, after the disappointing tenure of coach Vasilis Daniil was brought to an end after disappointing results, he returned to the international fold.

In his first game in his return, Nikolaidis scored in Greece's 2–2 away draw to England during the 2002 World Cup qualifiers. New coach Otto Rehhagel focused his offense around the quick striker and was rewarded with direct qualification to the Greek team to represent Greece at Euro 2004. Even though struggling with injury, Rehhagel nevertheless included him in his Euro 2004 squad. Greece's new strike force, Zisis Vryzas and Angelos Charisteas, played well enough, but Nikolaidis still figured consistently in the team, coming off the bench in all three group games before starting against France, and leading Greece to a tremendous shock victory. After that performance, however, Nikolaidis was seriously injured and did not even dress for Greece's last two games. He amassed 54 caps, netting 17 times for the national team and is among the top 6 goalscorers ever for Greece.

In 1997 he was called to the military team, where he won the World Military Cup of the same year, playing in the final against Italy.

Chairman of AEK Athens
With AEK struggling in the wake of Psomiadis' corruption and the prospect of relegation to the fourth division looming, Nikolaidis retired at the relatively young age of 31. His next move, supported by all AEK fans, was to establish a consortium of businessmen and purchase AEK on 27 May 2004, as he had always dreamed. Becoming the club's president, Nikolaidis set a goal that he would remove all debts that AEK owed and make them a force in Europe in the space of five years. He and technical director Ilija Ivić, a former teammate, made several clever signings and fought ferociously for the league title, finishing third when many had expected a mid-table performance. In his second year as president, after signing two promising Greece Under-21 players, as well as adding former star Vasilis Lakis, Ukrainian international striker Oleh Venhlinskyi and one time Inter centre back Bruno Cirillo, AEK achieved UEFA Champions League qualification. Apart from the improvement of the economic standards and the athletic performance of AEK, Nikolaidis called upon the league to do more to reduce violence and hooliganism.

On 2 November 2008, Demis decided that he would quit as chairman of AEK after continuously poor results, stating that he had not achieved his goal in the 5 years plan. Nikolaidis said one of his reasons for quitting was that the team didn't sell 30,000 season tickets; he stated "If I had managed to convince the AEK supporters to come to the stadium then I would not be leaving. In my mind we need 30,000 to become a big team". During Nikolaidis's presidency, AEK had their first wins in Champions' League and the club made about 12,000,000 euros from selling players to other teams (like Kostas Katsouranis, Sokratis Papastathopoulos, Dániel Tőzsér, Sotirios Kyrgiakos etc.).

Personal life
Demis was born in Germany and emigrated to Alexandroupoli when he was just 3. In 2003 he married a Greek singer Despina Vandi who was also born in Germany and grew up in Greece. They have a daughter named Melina (2004), and a son named Giorgos (2007). A Discovery Channel documentary entitled Europe's Richest People estimated the combined fortune of Nikolaidis and Vandi to be in excess of €25,000,000 in 2014.. The couple announced their divorce on 15 July 2021

Career statistics

Club

International

Scores and results list Greece's goal tally first, score column indicates score after each Nikolaidis goal.

Honours

AEK Athens
Greek Cup: 1996–97, 1999–2000, 2001–02
Greek Super Cup: 1996

Greece military
World Military Cup: 1997

Greece
UEFA European Championship: 2004

Individual
Alpha Ethniki top scorer: 1998–99
Greek Cup top scorer: 1995–96, 1999–2000
Greek Young Footballer of the year: 1995
Greek Footballer of the year: 1997, 1998, 2002
Fair Play Diploma for Act of Fair Play: 2002

Records
Second Greek goalscorer in European competitions scoring a total of 26 goals.
One of the few player who have scored five goals in a single Greek Super League game. He did so in AEK Athens' 6–1 win against Kalamata during the 1996–97 season.
Scorer of Greece's 500th goal on 6 October 2001 in a match against England.

References

1973 births
Living people
Sportspeople from Giessen
Footballers from Alexandroupolis
German people of Greek descent
German expatriate sportspeople in Spain
Greek footballers
Greece international footballers
Greek expatriate footballers
Greek expatriate sportspeople in Spain
Association football forwards
AEK Athens F.C. players
AEK Athens F.C. chairmen
Atlético Madrid footballers
Apollon Smyrnis F.C. players
Greek football chairmen and investors
La Liga players
UEFA Euro 2004 players
UEFA European Championship-winning players
Super League Greece players
Footballers from Hesse